Patrick Kerrigan (21 February 1928 – 4 July 1979) was an Irish Labour Party Senator and later a Teachta Dála (TD).

A trade union official, Kerrigan was an unsuccessful candidate in the Cork City North-West constituency at the 1969 general election. He lost again at the 1973 general election, when a Fine Gael-Labour Party coalition government took office. Kerrigan was then nominated by the Taoiseach, Liam Cosgrave, to the 13th Seanad, where he served until 1977.

At the 1977 general election, Kerrigan was elected in the new five-seat Cork City constituency, where Fianna Fáil leader Jack Lynch topped the poll with over 39% of the vote, leading his party to a landslide 20-seat majority in the 144-seat Dáil Éireann.

Kerrigan took his seat in the 21st Dáil, but died in office two years later on 4 July 1979, aged 51. The by-election for his Dáil seat was held on 7 November and won by Fine Gael's Liam Burke, a former TD who had lost his seat to Kerrigan at the 1977 general election.

Kerrigan was also Lord Mayor of Cork for the 1973 to 1974.

References

 

1928 births
1979 deaths
Labour Party (Ireland) TDs
Members of the 13th Seanad
Members of the 21st Dáil
Local councillors in Cork (city)
Lord Mayors of Cork
Nominated members of Seanad Éireann
Labour Party (Ireland) senators